International Cricket is a cricket video game for the Nintendo Entertainment System. It was developed by Melbourne based Beam Software and published under their Laser Beam Entertainment publishing arm in 1992. Aussie Rules Footy shares the same presentation style as this game. Like Aussie Rules Footy, the game was distributed exclusively by Mattel's Australian operation.

There were no attempts to release a cricket video game to the North American, Japanese, or European markets. The reason is that baseball games dominated the North American and Japanese markets, while soccer dominated the European market during that era. Two buttons are used to control the action; one for hitting the cricket ball while the other allows the player to slog around.

One of the shortcomings in the game is the simple AI; the average player can bowl the computer out for totals not exceeding 20.

Naming parodies
The game featured all the major Test cricket–playing nations but no official team and player licensing in place. This meant that player names within the game, particularly for the Australian team, were parodies on the actual names of cricket players at the time. Following is a list of player names from the game and their respective actual names from Test-playing teams.

 A. Boulder – Allan Border
 M. Sailor – Mark Taylor
 D. Boost – David Boon
 G. Swamp – Geoff Marsh
 J. Dean – Dean Jones
 S. Mars – Steve Waugh
 I. Hilly – Ian Healy
 R. Bruce – Bruce Reid
 M. Ewes – Mark Waugh
 C. McDirt – Craig McDermott
 H. Mervyn – Merv Hughes
 P. Tail – Peter Taylor
 T. Oldman – Terry Alderman

Variations of player names for other countries do not appear to be as obvious; however, there is a player in the West Indies team called "R. Marley", possibly a reference to Jamaican reggae musician Bob Marley.

Hidden features
Players can activate a sound test mode that allows them to hear the 24 songs and four sound samples that appear in-game. A hidden squad known as the Beam Team can be accessed by the player with little effort, requiring the repetitive use of two buttons.

Sequels
International Cricket was followed by an updated sequel for the Super NES, Super International Cricket, in 1994. Beam Software would also develop Cricket 96 and Cricket 97 for EA Sports.

References

1992 video games
Australia-exclusive video games
Cricket video games
Nintendo Entertainment System games
Nintendo Entertainment System-only games
Video games developed in Australia
Video games set in Australia
Multiplayer and single-player video games